Pascal Sevran (16 October 1945 – 9 May 2008) was a French TV presenter and author.

Biography
Son of a communist taxi driver, and a Spanish seamstress, Pascal Sevran was born on 16 October 1945 in Paris. His real name was Jean-Claude Jouhaud. He worked as a songwriter, a singer, a TV presenter, and an author. He was openly gay. He was involved in a racist controversy when he blamed the "black penis" for famine in Africa. He died on 9 May 2008 in Limoges.

Bibliography

As Book Author 
1979 : Le Passé Supplémentaire
1980 : Vichy Dancing
1982 : Un garçon de France
1995 : Tous les bonheurs sont provisoires
1998 : Mitterrand, les autres jours about his friendship with François Mitterrand
2006 : Journal (personal diary)

As songwriter
He wrote many songs, including :
 Il venait d'avoir 18 ans
 Comme disait Mistinguett
 C'est à Brasilia (music : Henri Betti)

As TV show presenter
 from 1984 to 1991 : La chance aux chansons (chance to songs) on TF1 channel, then from 1991 to 2000 on France 2 channel.
 Chanter la vie Sing the life
 Entrée d'Artiste, his last TV show, stopped in 2007

As an Actor
1991 : Les secrets professionnels du Dr Apfelglück

References

External links 
 Pascal Sevran
 
 

1945 births
2008 deaths
Deaths from lung cancer
Writers from Paris
French gay writers
French television presenters
20th-century French novelists
French male singer-songwriters
French people of Spanish descent
French LGBT novelists
20th-century French male singers
French male novelists
Roger Nimier Prize winners
20th-century French male writers
20th-century LGBT people